John Wesley Brien (November 24, 1864 - January 11, 1949) was a Canadian politician and physician. He was elected to the House of Commons of Canada in the 1917 election as a Member of the Unionist Party to represent the riding of Essex South. Prior to his federal political career, he had just served a year in the Canadian Expeditionary Force as a medical officer before being forced to return home due to injury. He also served as a captain in the British Canadian Recruiting Mission in Chicago, Illinois, United States of America.

Brien was born in Victoria County, Canada West. His cousin, James Brien, was also a Member of the House of Commons of Canada.

External links
 

1864 births
1949 deaths
Members of the House of Commons of Canada from Ontario
Unionist Party (Canada) MPs